Pâmella Nascimento de Oliveira (born 7 October 1987) is a Brazilian triathlete. She won a bronze medal at the 2011 Pan American Games. The following year, she competed in the Women's event at the 2012 Summer Olympics, finishing in 30th place. She finished in tenth place in the women's event at the 2015 Pan American Games.

References

External links
 

1987 births
Living people
Brazilian female triathletes
Olympic triathletes of Brazil
Pan American Games bronze medalists for Brazil
Triathletes at the 2011 Pan American Games
Triathletes at the 2012 Summer Olympics
Triathletes at the 2015 Pan American Games
Triathletes at the 2016 Summer Olympics
Sportspeople from Espírito Santo
Pan American Games medalists in triathlon
South American Games gold medalists for Brazil
South American Games silver medalists for Brazil
South American Games medalists in triathlon
Competitors at the 2014 South American Games
Medalists at the 2011 Pan American Games
20th-century Brazilian women
21st-century Brazilian women